Busnovi may refer to:

 Busnovi, Croatia, village near Brestovac
 Busnovi, Bosnia and Herzegovina, village near Prijedor